Clonmore may refer to:

Places
Northern Ireland
Clonmore, County Armagh, a hamlet and townland
Clonmore, County Tyrone, a townland

Republic of Ireland
Clonmore, County Carlow, a village
Clonmore, a former parish now part of Togher, County Louth
Clonmore, County Tipperary, a village
Clonmore, Kilcleagh, a townland in Kilcleagh civil parish, barony of Clonlonan, County Westmeath
Clonmore, Mullingar, a townland in Mullingar civil parish, barony of Moyashel and Magheradernon, County Westmeath
Clonmore, Street, a townland in Street civil parish, barony of Moygoish, County Westmeath